Henri Kontinen and John Peers were the defending champions, but lost in the quarterfinals to Ivan Dodig and Marcel Granollers.

Łukasz Kubot and Marcelo Melo won the title, defeating Dodig and Granollers in the final, 7–6(7–3), 3–6, [10–6]. Melo also regained the ATP no. 1 doubles ranking from Kontinen at the end of the tournament.

Seeds
All seeds received a bye into the second round.

Draw

Finals

Top half

Bottom half

References
 Main Draw

Doubles